Ferhatović or Ferhatovic is a surname. Notable people with the surname include:

Amar Ferhatović (born 1977), Bosnian footballer
Asim Ferhatović (1933–1987), professional footballer
Nidal Ferhatovic (born 1980), Bosnian footballer (striker)
Nijaz Ferhatović (born 1955), Bosnian defender

See also
Asim Ferhatović Hase Stadium, stadium owned by the city of Sarajevo

Bosnian surnames
Patronymic surnames